Blackbird Interactive is a Canadian video game development studio based in Vancouver, British Columbia.

History
Blackbird was founded in 2007 by former members of Relic Entertainment and EA Canada. CEO Rob Cunningham and chief creative officer Jon Aaron Kambeitz had also been founding members of Relic, and had been on the development team for the 1999 RTS Homeworld and its 2003 sequel, Homeworld 2. In 2010, after beginning operations, Blackbird began working on a game they considered a "spiritual successor" to Homeworld, entitled Hardware: Shipbreakers. The studio entered into negotiations with THQ, which controlled Relic, for adapting their original game into a Homeworld game, but were unable to secure access to the intellectual property.

THQ went bankrupt in April 2013, and sold off its assets at auction. Blackbird and Gearbox Software were among the bidders for the IP rights to Homeworld; Gearbox won the auction at $1.35 million. Gearbox allowed Blackbird to use the Homeworld IP and invested in the Hardware: Shipbreakers project, which was renamed Homeworld: Shipbreakers in September 2013. In December 2015, it was officially announced for release as Homeworld: Deserts of Kharak; it was released on January 20, 2016.

In February 2017, Blackbird announced a collaboration with NASA's Jet Propulsion Laboratory to create Project Eagle, an interactive art model of a base on Mars to be demonstrated live on stage at the 2017 D.I.C.E. Summit.

In August 2019, Blackbird announced that it had begun development of a new Homeworld title, Homeworld 3, as a direct sequel to Homeworld 2 released in 2003. As of the announcement date, the game was still in pre-production stages, and a tentative release date of late 2022 was given. Many key developers of the first two Homeworld games will return to lead the development of Homeworld 3, including Blackbird CEO Rob Cunningham and Homeworld soundtrack composer Paul Ruskay.

In November 2019, Blackbird announced that it had been involved in the development of Minecraft Earth.

Blackbird revived the Shipbreaker name and concept with the space salvage simulator Hardspace: Shipbreaker, which was released in early access on June 16, 2020.

From September to December 2021, Blackbird trialed the four-day work week with two of its teams, one of which was the team behind Shipbreaker. The trial was a success, with the majority of developers surveyed stating that it improved their work-life balance, wellness, and ability to complete work.  The studio intends to implement the four-day work week across all of its teams, beginning in April 2022.

Games developed

References

External links

Canadian companies established in 2007
Companies based in Vancouver
Video game companies established in 2007
Video game companies of Canada
Video game development companies
2007 establishments in British Columbia